Jean-Simon Roy (born November 20, 1993) is a former professional Canadian football offensive lineman. He is a two-time Vanier Cup champion, having won with the Laval Rouge et Or in 2013 and 2016.

College career
Roy played U Sports football for the Laval Rouge et Or from 2013 to 2016. He was a member of the 49th Vanier Cup championship team in his rookie year and also won the 52nd Vanier Cup in his final year in 2016. He was also named a U Sports First Team All-Canadian in 2016 at the offensive tackle position.

Professional career

Edmonton Eskimos
In the 2017 CFL Draft, Roy was selected in the second round, 14th overall, by the Edmonton Eskimos and signed with the team on May 25, 2017. He began the season on the injured list before moving to the reserve roster for two games. He then dressed in his first professional football game on August 10, 2017 in a game against the Ottawa Redblacks. He dressed in two total games in 2017 while spending the rest of the season on the injured list. In 2018, he dressed in one regular season game while splitting time between the reserve roster and the injured list. To begin the 2019 season, Roy was placed on the team's practice roster.

BC Lions
On June 11, 2019, it was announced that Roy had been claimed by the BC Lions from the Eskimos' practice roster and that Roy had agreed to join the Lions' active roster. He dressed as a back-up offensive lineman in the first two regular season games in 2019 before making his first professional start, playing at centre, in week 3 against the Calgary Stampeders. He played in seven of the first ten games of the season and spent the rest of the year on the injured list. He became a free agent on February 11, 2020.

Edmonton Eskimos / Elks
On the first day of free agency, on February 11, 2020, Roy signed with the Edmonton Eskimos. Due to the cancellation of the 2020 CFL season, Roy did not play in 2020 and signed an extension with Edmonton on December 30, 2020. He retired from football on June 28, 2021.

References

External links
 Edmonton Football Team bio

1993 births
Living people
BC Lions players
Canadian football offensive linemen
Edmonton Elks players
Laval Rouge et Or football players
Players of Canadian football from Quebec
People from Capitale-Nationale